Soraepogu Station is a railroad station in Namdong-gu, Incheon, South Korea. It opened on 30 June 2012. There are many stores and restaurants located around the station, including a large seafood complex. Near the station is a walkway along the ocean inlet with a metal lobster sculpture.

References

Metro stations in Incheon
Railway stations opened in 1937
Seoul Metropolitan Subway stations
Namdong District
Railway stations opened in 2012